The Karel Ančerl Gold Edition is the collection of 42 reissued and remastered albums, recorded by Czech conductor Karel Ančerl from 1950 until 1968, when the artist left Czechoslovakia in the wake of the Soviet invasion. The CDs were released by the Supraphon label between 2002 and 2005.

In 2006, this set was awarded the most prestigious prize by Grand Prix du Disque de l'Académie de Charles Cros due to the exceptional artistic and technical level of the classical music recordings. After 2005, Supraphon released the last four discs of the collection, linked as no. 43 of the set.

 Ančerl Gold 1: Bedřich Smetana - Má vlast (Czech Philharmonic), SU 3661-2 011
 Ančerl Gold 2: Antonín Dvořák - Symphony No. 9 "From The New World", In the Nature Realms, Othello Overture (Czech Philharmonic), SU 3662-2 011
 Ančerl Gold 3: Mendelssohn-Bartholdy, Bruch, Berg - Concertos for violin and orchestra (Josef Suk, Czech Philharmonic), SU 3663-2 011
 Ančerl Gold 4: Mussorgsky / Borodin / Rimski-Korsakov - Pictures At An Exhibition, Night on Bald Mountain / In the Steppes of Central Asia / Capriccio Espagnol, SU 3664-2 011
 Ančerl Gold 5: Stravinsky - Petrouchka, The Rite of Spring (Czech Philharmonic), SU 3665-2 011
 Ančerl Gold 6: Mahler / Strauss - Symphony No.1 / Till Eulenspiegel's Merry Pranks (Czech Philharmonic), SU 3666-2 011
 Ančerl Gold 7: Janáček - Glagolitic Mass, Taras Bulba (Czech Philharmonic and choir, soloists), SU 3667-2 911	
 Ančerl Gold 8: Antonín Dvořák / Josef Suk - Concerto and Romance for violin and orchestra / Phantasy for violin and orchestra (C.P.Orchestra, J.Suk-violin), SU 3668-2 011	
 
 
 
 	
 Ančerl Gold 13 Dvořák - Requiem (Czech Philharmonic, Prague Philharmonic Choir and soloists, 2 CD, SU 3673-2 212
 
 
 
 	
 
 
 	
 Ančerl Gold 21 Ladislav Vycpálek, Czech Requiem. Otmar Mácha Variations on a Theme and on the Death of Jan Rychlík / M.Řeháková, M.Mrázová, T.Šrubař/ČF/K.Ančerl, 2 CD, SU 3681-2 212	
 
 
 
 
 
 
 
 
 
 
 
 
 
 
 
 
 	
 
 
 
 	
 Ančerl Gold 43 Bořkovec, Britten, Dobiáš, Eben, Hurník, Jirko, Kalabis, Kalaš, Kapr, Seidel (Czech Philharmonic), 4 CD, SU 3944-2 011

References

Karel Ančerl albums
2005 classical albums